Coronanthera is a genus of shrubs in the family Gesneriaceae.  The genus is found in New Caledonia and Solomon Islands in the Pacific and contains c. 10 species

List of species 

 Coronanthera aspera - New Caledonia
 Coronanthera barbata - New Caledonia
 Coronanthera clarkeana - New Caledonia
 Coronanthera deltoidifolia - New Caledonia
 Coronanthera grandis - Solomon Islands
 Coronanthera pancheri - New Caledonia
 Coronanthera pedunculosa - New Caledonia
 Coronanthera pinguior - New Caledonia
 Coronanthera pulchra - New Caledonia
 Coronanthera sericea - New Caledonia
 Coronanthera squamata - New Caledonia

References 

Flora of New Caledonia
Endemic flora of New Caledonia
Gesnerioideae
Gesneriaceae genera